The Grand Astoria is a Russian rock band from Saint-Petersburg, founded in 2009 by Kamille Sharapodinov.

The current lineup includes:
 Danila Danilov – vocals
 Kamille Sharapodinov – vocals and guitar
 Igor Suvorov – guitar
 Dmitry Ogorodnov – bass
 Albert Vartanov – drums

The band's style is very eclectic and combines a variety of genres such as psychedelic rock, prog rock, fuzz rock, space rock, country, punk and heavy metal, citing Iron Maiden, Mudhoney, Megadeth, Faith No More, Jimi Hendrix, Motorpsycho among their major influences. DIY ethic is the usual way the band arranges their tours and record deals.
During the fall of 2010, The Grand Astoria played over 40 shows across Europe in support of their second album.

Their third album, titled Omnipresence, was released on 1 January 2011. On 5 August 2011 the 7" vinyl single "Caesar Enters the Palace of Doom" was released on German label Setalight Records.

Discography

Albums 
 The Grand Astoria (aka I) (2009)
 II (2010)
 Omnipresence (2011)
 Punkadelia Supreme (2013)
 La Belle Epoque (2014)
 The Mighty Few  (2015)

EPs 
 Deathmarch (2013)
 The Process of Weeding Out (Black Flag cover album) (2014)

Singles 
 Caesar Enters the Palace of Doom (2011, 7")
 Then You Win (2013, 7")
 Who's in Charge? (2014, CD-single)

Split albums 
 To Whom It May Concern (split with US Christmas) (2012, 12")
 The Body Limits (split with Montenegro) (2014, CD)
 Blessed, Cursed and Crucified (split with Mother Mars) (2014, 7")
 Kobaia Express (split with Samavayo) (2015, 10")

Compilation albums 
 Cowbells and Cobwebs ("Raise the Dead") (2010, Planetfuzz Records)
 Roqueting Through Space ("Oh, Yeah") (2011, Fruits de Mer Records)
 Son of the Transcendental Maggot ("Light: Look at Your Sun") (2011, Tsuguri Records)

References

External links
The Grand Astoria
SLR 019: The Grand Astoria – Caesar Enters The Palace of Doom - 7inch - 2011 (Setalight) - SetalightSetalight

Musical groups from Saint Petersburg
Russian hard rock musical groups
Space rock musical groups
Russian psychedelic rock music groups
Russian progressive rock groups
Fruits de Mer Records artists